Karrab Rural District is a rural district (dehestan) in the Central District of Sabzevar County, Razavi Khorasan Province, Iran. At the 2006 census, its population was 3,335, in 1,106 families.  The rural district has 9 villages.

References 

Rural Districts of Razavi Khorasan Province
Sabzevar County